Basco, officially the Municipality of Basco, is a 5th class municipality and capital of the province of Batanes, Philippines. According to the 2020 census, it has a population of 9,517 people.

Basco is located on Batan Island, the second largest among the Batanes Islands, the northernmost islands of the Philippines. The town has a domestic airport, Basco Airport, serving flights from Manila and Baguio.

The Basco Lighthouse is one of the landmarks.

Etymology
The town is named after Capitán General José Basco, who led the pacification and conquest of the islands during his term as Governor-General.

Geography
According to the Philippine Statistics Authority, the municipality has a land area of  constituting  of the  total area of Batanes.

Barangays
Basco is politically subdivided into 6 barangays. These barangays are headed by elected officials: Barangay Captain, Barangay Council, whose members are called Barangay Councilors. All are elected every three years.

The sitio of Diptan was converted into a barrio, known as San Antonio, in 1955. Also in the same year, the sitios of Coral, Hago, Tuva, Diojango, Canalaan, Honaan and Dimnalamay were converted into the barrio of San Joaquin.

Climate

Basco has a tropical monsoon climate (Köppen climate classification Am), with slightly cooler temperatures especially during the winter months due to its northerly location compared to other cities down south such as Laoag or Manila. Unlike these two cities whose hottest months are April and May, Basco experiences its warmest temperature during the months of June and July, similar to Taiwan.

Demographics

In the 2020 census, Basco had a population of 9,517.

Economy

Government
Basco, belonging to the lone congressional district of the province of Batanes, is governed by a mayor designated as its local chief executive and by a municipal council as its legislative body in accordance with the Local Government Code. The mayor, vice mayor, and the councilors are elected directly by the people through an election which is being held every three years.

Elected officials

Transportation
Basco is accessible by air from Manila via Basco Airport. It is served by PAL Express and SKYJET, and via Tuguegarao in Cagayan by Regional Airlines like NorthSky Air and Air Republiq (as of January 2013).

Education
The Schools Division of Batanes governs the town's public education system. The division office is a field office of the DepEd in Cagayan Valley region. The office governs the public and private elementary and public and private high schools throughout the municipality.

Schools
 Basco Central School
 Batanes National Science High School
 Batanes State College
 Chanarian Elementary School
 Diptan Elementary School
 Saint Dominic College
 Tukon Elementary School
 Valugan Integrated School

References

External links

 [ Philippine Standard Geographic Code]

Municipalities of Batanes
Provincial capitals of the Philippines